Events in the year 1990 in the Federal Republic of Germany and East Germany.

Incumbents

Federal Republic of Germany
President – Richard von Weizsäcker
Chancellor – Helmut Kohl

East Germany (until 2 October)
Head of State
Manfred Gerlach (until 5 April 1990)
Sabine Bergmann-Pohl (5 April – 2 October 1990)
Head of Government
 Hans Modrow (until 12 April 1990)
Lothar de Maizière (12 April – 2 October 1990)

Events 
 Die Wende
 29 March - Germany in the Eurovision Song Contest 1990

January 
 January 15 - East German demonstrations: Demonstrators in East Berlin stormed the headquarters of Stasi

February 
 February 2 - Rüsselsheim train disaster
 February 9-20 - 40th Berlin International Film Festival

March 
 18 March – 1990 East German general election

July 
 1 July – German reunification: The Deutsche Mark became East Germany's currency with the West, replacing the East German mark
 8 July - West Germany defeats Argentina 1–0 to win the 1990 FIFA World Cup.

August 
 23 August – German reunification: East Germany votes to dissolve its independence and will join with West Germany effective on the 3rd of October
 31 August – German reunification: West and East Germany signed a unification treaty

September 
 12 September - German reunification: Treaty on the Final Settlement with Respect to Germany

October 
 3 October – German reunification: West and East Germany reunified as a single Germany. Berlin becomes the official capital

November 
 14 November – German–Polish Border Treaty

December 
 2 December – 1990 German federal election

Births

4 January – Toni Kroos, German footballer
28 January - Markus Deibler, German swimmer
30 January – Nils Miatke, German footballer
18 March - Wilson Gonzalez Ochsenknecht, German actor
10 April – Christoph Harting, German athlete specialising in the discus throw
14 April – Markus Smarzoch, German footballer
30 April - Michael Schulte, German singer
7 May - Sideris Tasiadis, German canoeist
12 May - Tobias Strobl, German footballer
1 June – Kieren Emery, German-English rower
3 June – Fabian Götze, German footballer
7 June – Benjamin Woltmann, German footballer
14 June - Robert Hering, German sprinter
2 July - Roman Lob, German singer
4 July -  David Kross, German actor
21 August – Jana Majunke, German Paralympic cyclist
6 November – André Schürrle, German footballer
10 November - Kristina Vogel, German cyclist
18 November – Kira Walkenhorst, German beach volleyball player

Deaths

8 January - Horst Freiherr Treusch von Buttlar-Brandenfels, German general (born 1900)
20 March - Wilhelm Neef, German composer and conductor (born 1916)
28 March - Kurt Scharf, German clergyman and bishop of the Evangelical Church in Berlin-Brandenburg (born 1902) 
14 April - Martin Kessel, German writer  (born 1901)
15 April - Helmut Lemke, German politician (born 1907)
20 April - Horst Sindermann, German politician (born 1915)
5 May - Walter Bruch, German electrical engineer (born 1908)
9 July - Horst Rittel, German design theorist (born 1930)
9 July - Friedrich Wegener, German pathologist (born 1907)
14 July – Walter Sedlmayr, German actor (born 1926)
7 August - Gebhard Müller, German politician (born 1900)
23 August - Karl II, 8th Prince of Löwenstein-Wertheim-Rosenberg. German nobleman (born 1904)
29 October - Volker von Collande, German actor and film director (born 1913)
24 November – Helga Feddersen, German actress, comedian, singer, author, and theater director (born 1930)
7 December - Horst Bienek, German economist  (born 1930)

See also
1990 in German television

References

 
Years of the 20th century in Germany
Germany
Germany